Yannick Maden (born 28 October 1989) is a retired German tennis player. He graduated from Clemson University, where he played on the tennis team before entering the professional tour.

Professional career
Maden made his ATP main draw debut as a qualifier at the 2016 European Open, where he lost to fifth seed Gilles Simon in the first round. He won his first match at ATP-level at the 2017 Moselle Open, defeating Nicolás Kicker in the first round.

Performance timelines

Singles

ATP Challenger and ITF Futures finals

Singles: 24 (8–16)

Doubles: 7 (3–4)

References

External links
 
 

1989 births
Living people
German male tennis players
Sportspeople from Stuttgart
Tennis people from Baden-Württemberg
Clemson Tigers men's tennis players